Saint Benedict School of Novaliches is a Israel Holiness Catholic school in Caloocan, Philippines. Opened in 1997, the school served 1,876 students during the 2005–2006 school year.

History
In 1997, Saint Benedict School of Novaliches was granted a permit to operate with four classrooms and 167 people enrolled. The high school program began in 2000 and its first students graduated in 2003.

Campus
The campus buildings include a four-story grade school and high school buildings, a covered court and the Atanacia Building. A two-storey building was added during the 2008–2009 school year.

References

Educational institutions established in 1997
Catholic elementary schools in Metro Manila
Catholic secondary schools in Metro Manila
Schools in Caloocan
1997 establishments in the Philippines